The following list of New York companies includes notable companies that are, or once were, headquartered in New York.

Companies based in New York

0–9
 10x Management
 1-800-Flowers

A

 Abel Honor New York
 AEC Daily Corporation
 AERCO International
 Aéropostale
 Altice USA
 Ambac
 American Broadcasting Company 
 American Express
 AIG
 Ann Inc.
 APriori Capital Partners
 Arizona Beverage Company
 Associated Supermarkets
 Assurant
 Atlas Air

B

 B&H Photo
 The Bank of New York Mellon
 Barnes & Noble
 BlackRock
 Bloomberg L.P.
 Bowery Farming
 Bristol-Myers Squibb
 Brooks Brothers
 Bulova

C

 CA Technologies
 Calvin Klein
 Carlisle Collection
 Carrols Restaurant Group
 Caxton Associates
 Citigroup
 Coach New York
 Colgate-Palmolive
 Cohen's Fashion Optical
 Colonial Media and Entertainment
 College Daily
 CPI Aerostructures
 The Compleat Sculptor
 Consolidated Edison
 Constellation Brands
 ContiGroup Companies
 Corning Inc.
 Country-Wide Insurance Company

D

 D'Agostino Supermarkets
 D. E. Shaw & Co.
 DeBeer Lacrosse
 Depository Trust & Clearing Corporation
 DKNY
 DLJ Merchant Banking Partners
 Dorm Company Corporation 
 Dow Jones & Company
 Duane Reade
 Dylan's Candy Bar

E
 Energy Brands

F

 Firstrade Securities
 Foot Locker
 Fox Corporation
 FreshDirect
 The Frye Company
 FUBU

G

 GAMCO Investors
 General Maritime Corporation
 GoldenSource
 Goldman Sachs
 Griffon Corporation
 The Guardian Life Insurance Company of America

H

 Hain Celestial Group
 Harman Kardon
 Hauppauge Computer Works
 Henry Schein
 Hess Corporation
 HRG Group
 HSBC Bank USA

I

 IAC
 IBM
 Iconix Brand Group
 Icahn Enterprises
 The Interpublic Group of Companies
 ITerating
 ITT Inc.
 Izzy Gold Records

J

 J.Crew
 JPMorgan Chase
 J. Press
 Jarden
 Jefferies Group
 JetBlue
 Jingle Punks Music

K

 Kate Spade & Company
 K&N's Foods USA
 Kennedy Fried Chicken
 Kenneth Cole Productions
 Key Food
 Kimber Manufacturing
 King Kullen
 Kodak
 Krinos Foods

L
 Lillian Vernon
 Loews Corporation
 Logicworks
 Lowy Frame and Restoring Company

M

 M&T Bank
 Macy's
 MapEasy
 Marsh & McLennan Companies
 Marshall Farms
 Martha Stewart Living Omnimedia
 Marvel Entertainment
 Mastercard
 MBIA
 McGraw-Hill Education
 Mediacom
 Merrill Lynch
 MetLife
 Mighty Taco
 Monster Worldwide
 Moody's Investors Service
 Morgan Stanley
 Mrs. John L. Strong
 MSCI

N

 NASDAQ
 Nathan's Famous
 National Fuel Gas
 NBCUniversal
 NBT Bank
 NBTY
 NEON Communications Group, Inc.
 New Era Cap Company
 New York & Company
 New York Community Bank
 New York Life Insurance Company
 The New York Times Company
 News Corp
 Nine West Holdings
 NOCO Energy Corporation

O
 OMD Worldwide
 Omnicom Group
 Orange County Choppers
 Operative Media

P

 Pall Corporation
 Parsons Brinckerhoff
 Partners and Napier
 Paychex
 PepsiCo
 Pfizer
 Phat Farm
 PVH
 Pond5
 Prestige Brands
 Price Chopper Supermarkets
 PricewaterhouseCoopers
 The Princeton Review

Q
 Quadrangle Group

R

 Ralph Lauren Corporation
 Random House
 Reader's Digest
 Regeneron Pharmaceuticals
 Revlon
 RFID Journal
 Rick's Picks
 Robert Graham
 RTTS

S

 Saks Fifth Avenue
 Sam Ash Music
 Scholastic Corporation
 Seneca Foods
 Simon & Schuster
 Skanska USA Inc
 Sony Corporation of America
 Steven Madden
 Stewart's Shops
 Strat-O-Matic
 STV Inc.
 Sullivan & Company
 Supreme
 Systemax

T

 Take-Two Interactive
 TheStreet.com
 TIAA
 Tiffany & Co.
 Time Life
 Topps
 Tops Friendly Markets
 Toshiba America Inc.
 Trans World Entertainment
 The Trump Organization
 TrustCo Bank

U
 Union Square Ventures
 Unpakt

V
 Verizon Communications
 ViacomCBS
 Volt Technical Resources
 Vornado Realty Trust

W
 Warner Bros. Discovery
 Warner Music Group
 Wegmans 
 WeWork

Z
 Zoo York

Companies formerly based in New York

0-9
 21st Century Fox

A

 Alling and Cory
 Alcoa 
 Alpha Books
 Altria 
 Arbitron
 Asbury Automotive Group
 Atari
 Avon Products
 AXA

B

 Bankers Trust
 Barr Pharmaceuticals
 Bausch & Lomb
 Bear Stearns
 Benihana
 Bovis Lend Lease

C
 Chemical Bank
 CIT Group
 CommutAir

D
 DC Comics
 Deloitte
 Dover Corporation

F
 First Niagara Bank
 Forest Laboratories

G

 General Electric
 General Laundry Machine
 Genesee & Wyoming
 Gentiva Health Services]
 George Schlegel Lithographing Co.
 Giant Markets
 Grand Union
 Gulf+Western

H
 Hachette Filipacchi Media U.S.
 Harden Furniture
 R.H. Hooper & Company

I
 ImClone Systems

K

 Kahr Arms
 Kaplan, Inc.
 Kaye Scholer
 KPMG

L
 Lehman Brothers 
 Loehmann's
 Lord & Taylor

M
 Maco
 Manufacturers Hanover Corporation
 MRU Holdings

N

 News Corporation
 North American Airlines
 North Fork Bank
 NYSE Euronext

P

 Paramount Communications
 Paris Decorators Corporation
 Penn Traffic
 Pennino Brothers Jewelry
 Playboy Automobile Company

R
Rome Company, Inc.

S

 Sbarro
 Schlumberger Ltd.
 Scientific Games Corporation
 Sirius Satellite Radio
 Six Flags
 Snapple Beverage Corp
 Sofro Restaurant Corporation
 Sony BMG

T

 TGI Fridays
 togglethis
 Toys R Us
 Tru Kids
 Turtle Beach Corporation
 Tyco

V
 Viacom (1952-2005)

W
 Warnaco Group
 Warner Communications
 The Weinstein Company

See also
 List of companies based in New York City
 List of property developers based in New York

New York